The Commander of the Israeli Navy is the head and highest-ranking officer of the Israeli Navy, and has operational control and is responsible for overall operations of the navy. The current Commander Eli Sharvit.

List of officeholders

References

Israeli Navy
Israel